Daniel Nicklasson (born 23 April 1981) is a Swedish retired footballer who played as a midfielder.

External links

GAIS profile
Eliteprospects profile

1981 births
Living people
IFK Göteborg players
GAIS players
Swedish footballers
Mjällby AIF players
Association football midfielders